General Glover Farm is a historic 2.4 acre property with a 1700s colonial farmhouse that was home to the Revolutionary War hero General John Glover, and is located on the Marblehead - Swampscott - Salem border. The site also includes a collection of other historic buildings representing different eras of the farms history, including an old barn, inn building, and former store.

History 

The main colonial style farm house was originally built in 1700s prior to the American Revolution. It was owned by William Browne of Salem, a British Loyalist, who had accepted an appointment by General Gage as judge of the superior colonial court. Because of this connection, he was listed on the Banishment Act of 1778 and was forbidden to return to Massachusetts. This would lead to his property being confiscated by the colonial Massachusetts government in 1780.  

In February 1781, General John Glover, an American military hero, famous for rowing Washington's troops across the Delaware, the Battle of Long Island, and leading the first integrated regiment in the American military, purchased the house.  He paid 1369 pounds for the house and 180 acres of land to the state government. As recorded in Registry of Deeds:  

Resolve on Petition of John Glover, Bridagadier General in the American Army: "Resolve that the committee for selling the estate of absentees in the County of Essex be, and they hereby are authorized and directed to appoint five sufficient freeholders in said Country, who are to be under oath, to appraise that part of William Brown, Esqrs., estate lately occupied by Thomas Vining and others, lying in Salem and Marblehead, in said Country, and said Committee are authorized and directed to give a deed to John Glover at said appeasement of said farm in behalf of this Commonwealth, and to take in pay notes given him by this State for his wages etc., which shall become payable in March next, at the real value, and the balance if any to be paid, in current money." (February 17, 1781)  John Glover moved to his farmhouse in 1782 after retiring from his military service, moving both his family and business to the house.  While living in the house, he stayed active in politics, and was elected as a delegate to the Massachusetts ratifying convention for the U.S. Constitution, served as town selectman, and was in the Massachusetts House of Representatives. He would also lead the official welcome of President George Washington and the Marquis de Lafayette who came to Marblehead in 1789 to see their old army friend and thank those who served during the war.

John Glover would continue to live at the farm, and operate his business from the house. He would propose building a canal via Forest River that would link his farm to the sea. This would permit his vessels to unload goods in Salem and bring them up in smaller boats to his store at the farm. However this was never realized. John Glover would live here the remainder of his life, until his death in January 1797.

After his death, the farm property was eventually sold by the Glover family.  It continued to be used as a farm, until the main house eventually became the General Glover Inn. The Inn would later become part of the Sunbeam farm, and lasted until the 1950s, when in 1957 it opened as the General Glover House Restaurant by Anthony Athanas Various additions were added on to the main house, with the multiple dining rooms and bars themed to a colonial inn.  The restaurant closed in the 1990s, and remains abandoned to this day. 

In 2020 the property was deemed "blighted" and the Athanas family was given a deadline to address the safety concerns of the abandoned property. 

In 2022 a 140-unit condominium was proposed to be built on the land spanning Swampscott and Marblehead. The proposed site plans do not currently reflect saving the original historic 1700s farmhouse of revolutionary war veteran General Glover or any of the other farm buildings. 

As of 2023, the historic 1700s farmhouse, along with many of the other historic buildings remain intact on the property at 299 Salem Street but are threatened by demolition.

References

American Revolutionary War
Farms in Massachusetts
Buildings and structures in Swampscott, Massachusetts
Houses in Essex County, Massachusetts
Houses in Marblehead, Massachusetts
Houses in Salem, Massachusetts
1700s architecture